Tin in Iran may refer to:
 Tin, Ahar (تين - Tīn), East Azerbaijan Province
 Tin, Khoda Afarin (طين - Ţīn), East Azerbaijan Province
 Tin, Kermanshah (تين - Tīn)